Pan Tianshou (1897–1971) was a Chinese painter and art educator.

Pan was born in Guanzhuang, Ninghai County, Zhejiang Province, and graduated from Zhejiang First Normal School (now Hangzhou High School). He studied Chinese traditional painting with Wu Changshuo, and built the foundation of Chinese traditional painting education.  He was persecuted during the Cultural Revolution until his death in 1971.

Biography

Early life and education
On March 14, 1897 (lunar calendar February 12), he was born in Guanzhuang Village, Ninghai County, Zhejiang Province. His birth name was Pan Tianjin and courtesy name Tianshou.

In 1903, his mother died. In summer, he was enrolled in private school in the village. Beside taking classes, he liked calligraphy, and also enjoyed imitating illustrations on novels such as the Romance of the Three Kingdoms and the Water Margin.

In Spring 1910, he entered Zhengxue Primary School in town, and received western school education. After class, he was interested in calligraphy, painting and stamp carving. He brought "Jieziyuan Painting Album" and several albums of models of calligraphy. Those were enlightening materials for him to self-study Chinese painting and calligraphy, and he thus was determined to devote his whole life to Chinese painting.

In Autumn 1915, he was enrolled into Zhejiang First Normal School in Hangzhou with excellent grades.

In 1918, he was on 4th grade at school, and drew "Loquats" for fellow students.

In 1919, he drew "Chinese Bulbul on Wisteria" and other paintings for fellow students. In that year, he participated in "May 4th" patriotic students gathering in Hangzhou. Around 1919 to 1920, he met Liu Haisu for first time in Jingjia Hill, Hangzhou.

In Spring 1920, he participated in advanced students uprising at Zhejiang First Normal School.  In leisure time, he dedicatedly studies painting, calligraphy, poems and stamp carving. He drew "Desolate Crow in Sparse Forest" and "Forlorn Bell Rings among Mountains at Night"() for Zhao Pingfu (Rou Shi).

In 1921, he habitually imitated ancient folk calligraphy and paintings, and studies painting theory. He drew "Bright Moon above Wisteria", "Mynah in Snow" etc.

Career
In Summer, he graduated and went back to Ninghai to teach at Zhengxue Primary School. In Spring 1922, he moved to teach at the primary school in Xiaofeng County (now Anji County), Zhejiang. Together with Shen Suizhen, he held an exhibition in Yizi Pavilion, Xiaofeng County. There were finger-ink painting among his works. He drew "Lonely Crow on Aged Tree", "Pristine Water in Breeze", "Jigong Monk and Elephant", "Bald Monk", etc.

In Spring 1923, he became a teacher at Republic of China female workers school in Shanghai. In that Summer, he was also appointed as a lecturer in painting practice and theory classes in department of Chinese painting at Shanghai Academy of Fine Arts. He got to know Wu Changshuo, Wang Yiting, Huang Binhong, Wu Fuzhi, and Zhu Qizhan. His style approached Wu Changshuo, evolving from unrestrained to profound. He drew "Flowers Wet with Dew in Autumn". He changed his name to "Tianshou".

In 1924, he became a professor at Shanghai Academy of Fine Arts, started writing the book "The History of Chinese Painting". He was actively engaged in a variety of exhibitions, studying preserved ancient paintings and meeting with noted painters. He specialized in liberal-style flowers and birds painting, and also excelled in landscape painting. He drew "The Beggar", "Horse Fastened on Poplar", and "Fox Servant at New Year Eve".

In January 1925, he completed "History of Chinese Painting" in Shanghai, and wrote preface of the book in Hangzhou in February. On June 20, he co-sponsored an advertisement on "Sheng Newspaper" with Liu Haisu, Zhu Wenyun and other professors, and held a charity sale exhibition for workers and citizens deceased in May 30 Riot. He drew "Mountains at Dawn", "Soothing Spring Breeze", "Aged Plum Blossoms", etc.

In July 1926, his "History of Chinese Painting" was published by Commercial Press. In Winter, together with Yu Jifan and Pan Booying, he co-founded Shanghai Xinhua School of Fine Arts.

In Spring 1927, Xinhua School enrolled first-year class, and Pan became the chief professor in Education Department.

Pan was appointed director of the National Academy (Zhejiang Academy of Fine Arts) by the Kuomintang Minister of Culture Chen Lifu in 1945. Two years later, he lost his appointment to Wang Rizhang, who was more acceptable to the Guomindang. Despite this professional disappointment, Pan took up his painting with renewed energy, making breakthrough works that fused modern and traditional idioms. In the era of People's Republic, he was again appointed the head of the academy in 1957 which lasted until 1966.

Political persecution and death
During the Cultural Revolution, Pan was taken by the Red Guards on 6 September 1966, and paraded the next day on the streets of Hangzhou with more than thirty of his colleagues in dunce caps to be publicly humiliated.  For five years, he was regularly taken to public rallies to be criticized and renounced.  He was also falsely accused of being a Kuomintang spy, after which the persecution became more intense and he was paraded in the other towns as well.  He died in a hospital in Hangzhou on 5 September 1971.

References

External links
Pan Tianshou and his Painting Gallery at China Online Museum

1897 births
1971 deaths
Hangzhou High School alumni
Painters from Zhejiang
Educators from Ningbo
Writers from Ningbo
Victims of the Cultural Revolution
Republic of China historians
Republic of China painters
Artists from Ningbo
20th-century Chinese historians
Historians from Zhejiang
Chinese art educators